The Journal of Marketing Theory and Practice is a quarterly peer-reviewed academic journal covering research on marketing. It was established in 1992 and is published by Routledge. The editor-in-chief is Raj Agnihotri (Iowa State University).

Abstracting and indexing
The journal is abstracted and indexed in:
EBSCO databases
Emerging Sources Citation Index
ProQuest databases
Scopus

References

External links

Routledge academic journals
Quarterly journals
Marketing journals
Publications established in 1992
English-language journals